Nemanja Milisavljević (born 1 November 1984) is a Serbian professional footballer who plays as a winger for Trayal Kruševac.

Club career
Born in Brus, Milisavljević made his first senior appearances with Radnički Niš in 2002. He spent three seasons at the club, before transferring to OFK Beograd in the summer of 2005. Six months later, Milisavljević returned to Radnički Niš.

In the 2007 winter transfer window, Milisavljević moved abroad to Macedonia and joined Rabotnički. He helped them win the double in the 2007–08 season. Afterwards, Milisavljević switched to fellow Macedonian club Vardar.

In the 2009 winter transfer window, Milisavljević was transferred to Romanian side Vaslui. He spent the next three and a half years there, before moving to fellow Liga I club Rapid București. In early 2013, Milisavljević signed with Bulgarian champions Ludogorets Razgrad. He also played for CSKA Sofia and Beroe Stara Zagora.

In June 2017, Milisavljević signed a one-year deal with Napredak Kruševac. He moved to crosstown rivals Trayal Kruševac in June 2018.

International career
In 2003, Milisavljević represented Serbia and Montenegro at under-19 level.

Honours
Rabotnički
 Macedonian First League: 2007–08
 Macedonian Cup: 2007–08
CS Vaslui
Liga I runner-up: 2011–12
Ludogorets Razgrad
 Bulgaria A Group: 2012–13

References

External links
 Srbijafudbal profile
 
 
 

Association football midfielders
First Professional Football League (Bulgaria) players
Expatriate footballers in Bulgaria
Expatriate footballers in Romania
Expatriate footballers in North Macedonia
FC Rapid București players
FC Vaslui players
First League of Serbia and Montenegro players
FK Napredak Kruševac players
FK Rabotnički players
FK Radnički Niš players
FK Trayal Kruševac players
FK Vardar players
Liga I players
OFK Beograd players
PFC Beroe Stara Zagora players
PFC CSKA Sofia players
PFC Ludogorets Razgrad players
Serbian expatriate footballers
Serbian expatriate sportspeople in Bulgaria
Serbian expatriate sportspeople in Romania
Serbian expatriate sportspeople in North Macedonia
Serbian First League players
Serbian footballers
Serbian SuperLiga players
1984 births
Living people